H. vulgaris may refer to:
 Hippuris vulgaris, the common mare's tail, a common aquatic plant species found in Eurasia
 Hydra vulgaris, a small freshwater hydroid species
 Hydrocotyle vulgaris, the marsh pennywort, a small creeping perennial herb species native to North Africa, Europe, Florida and west to the Caspian region

See also
 Vulgaris (disambiguation)